Indian Science Congress Association(ISCA) is a premier scientific organisation of India with headquarters at Kolkata, West Bengal. The association started in the year 1914 in Kolkata and it meets annually in the first week of January. It has a membership of more than 30,000 scientists.

The first Indian Science Congress was held in 1914 at the Asiatic Society in Calcutta. After pseudoscientific speeches at the 2019 Indian Science Congress, the congress has established a policy that requires speakers at future conferences to be vetted and scrutinizes the content of their talks.

Several prominent Indian and foreign scientists, including Nobel laureates, attend and speak in the congress.

Genesis 
The Indian Science Congress Association (ISCA) owes its origin to the foresight and initiative of two British chemists, namely, Professor J. L. Simonsen and Professor P. S. MacMahon. It occurred to them that scientific research in India might be stimulated if an annual meeting of research workers somewhat on the lines of the British Association for the Advancement of Science could be arranged.

Objectives 
The Association was formed with the following objectives :
 To advance and promote the cause of science in India;
 To hold an annual congress at a suitable place in India;
 To publish such proceedings, journals, transactions and other publications as may be considered desirable;
 To secure and manage funds and endowments for the promotion of Science including the rights of disposing of or selling all or any portion of the properties of the Association;
 To do and perform any or all other acts, matters and things as are conductive to, or incidental to, or necessary for, the above objects.

Indian Science Congress sessions

First Congress 
The first meeting of the congress was held from 15 to 17 January 1914 at the premises of the Asiatic Society, Calcutta. Honorable justice Sir Ashutosh Mukherjee, the then Vice Chancellor of the University of Calcutta presided over the Congress. One hundred and five scientists from different parts of India and abroad attended it. Altogether 35 papers under 6 different sections, namely Botany, Chemistry, Ethnography, Geology, Physics and Zoology were presented.

Silver Jubilee 
The Silver Jubilee Session of the Science Congress was held at Calcutta in 1938 under the presidency of Lord Rutherford of Nelson but due to his sudden death, Sir James Hopwood Jeans took the chair. It was at this Jubilee Session that the participation of foreign scientists in session of the Indian Science Congress was first initiated.

34th Edition – Participation of foreign scientists 
The 34th Annual Session of the Indian Science Congress was held at Delhi in 3–8 January 1947 with Pandit Jawaharlal Nehru as General president. Pandit Nehru's personal interest in the Science Congress continued and there was hardly any session which he did not attend. He immensely enriched the activities of the Congress by his sustained interest in the development of scientific atmosphere in the country, particularly among young generations. From 1947, his programme for inviting representatives from foreign societies and academies was included in the Science Congress. This trend still continues with the support of the Department of Science & Technology, Government of India.

Golden Jubilee 
The Science Congress celebrated its Golden Jubilee in October 1963 at Delhi with Prof.D. S. Kothari as General president. On this occasion two special publications were brought out:
 A short History of the Indian Science Congress Association and
 Fifty Years of Science in India (in 12 volumes, each volume containing reviews of particular branch of science)

Diamond Jubilee 
The Diamond Jubilee Session of the Science Congress was held at Chandigarh in 3–9 January 1973, under the presidency of Dr.S.Bhagavantam. On this occasion two special publications were brought out:
 A Decade (1963–72) Indian Science Congress Association (with life-sketches of General presidents) and
 A Decade (1963–72) of Science in India(in section-wise).

63rd edition – Introduction of focal theme 
The year 1976 witnessed a significant departure in the trend of deliberations during the congress. It was being felt for sometime that such a gathering of scientists, covering a wide spectrum, ought to be concerned with national issues that have scientific and technological implications. In 1976, Dr. M. S. Swaminathan, the then General President of ISCA introduced the Focal Theme of national relevance which is now discussed in every section, committee and forum during the annual session. These apart, several plenary sessions are organised around various facets of the Focal Theme in which scientists and technologists as well as policy makers and administrators interact with one another. ISCA thus became a platform where members from different disciplines and from different walks of life could contribute to discussions on the Focal Theme.

67th edition – Setting up of a task force 
Another significant breakthrough was made in 1980 when the Department of Science & Technology, Government of India, set up a permanent Task Force involving representatives of ISCA and chiefs of different agencies and voluntary organizations chaired by Secretary, DST, as being responsible for following up various recommendations on the Focal Theme. Every year follow-up actions on recommendations made in the previous Science Congress are discussed at a General Session organized by DST during the Science Congress. Through this process, the Indian Science Congress Association has been contributing to the development of Science in general and National Science Policy, in particular.

Platinum Jubilee 
The Indian Science Congress Association celebrated the seventy-fifth year of its inception, popularly called otherwise, Platinum Jubilee, in 1988, with Prof. C. N. R. Rao as General president. Keeping this in view, a special brochure, entitled "Indian Science Congress Association-Growth & Activities" was published so as to highlight the programmes of the Association over the years. The main programmes were:
 Bringing out special publication on the occasion of the Platinum Jubilee
 Presentation of Plaques to the General presidents of the Association
 Establishment of Platinum Jubilee Lectures to be organised in each section during the annual session of the Science Congress and
 Extension of the recent activities of the ISCA and its further diversification to generate scientific temper and popularise science

98th edition 

The five-day-long session, from 3 to 7 January 2011, at the Campus of SRM Institute of Science and Technology, Chennai was inaugurated by prime minister Manmohan Singh on 3 January 2011. The focal theme of this session was: "Quality education and excellence in scientific research in Indian universities". The prime minister said: "The Indian scientific community must apply its research findings and translate them into marketable products for the country to realize the true benefits of scientific progress. At the same time, he cautioned on "illiberal" uses of technology and cited use of nuclear weapons, applications of synthetic chemistry in agriculture and in poison gases and "perverse use" of genetics in Nazi Germany to drive home his point.

Nobel laureates Amartya Sen, Venkatraman Ramakrishnan, Ada Yonath, Thomas A. Steitz, Tim Hunt and Martin Chalfie delivered special lectures at the congress. Venkata Ramakrishnan inaugurated the parallel Children's Science Congress on Tuesday, 4 January 2011.

99th edition 
The five-day, 99th edition of the ISCA, from 3 to 7 January 2012 was hosted by KIIT University and National Institute of Science Education and Research (NISER) in Bhubaneswar, Orissa.  It saw the participation of more than 15,000 delegates, which included 500 foreign scientists and 20 Nobel laureates. It was inaugurated by the incumbent Prime Minister of India, Manmohan Singh. On its sidelines, the first Women's Science Congress was inaugurated by Nirupama Rao, India's ambassador to United States of America and the Children's Science Congress was inaugurated by the former President of India, A. P. J. Abdul Kalam.

Centenary edition 

The 100th edition was hosted by the University of Calcutta which is in the city of Kolkata from 3 to 7 January 2013. The theme of the Centenary Congress was, "Science for shaping the future of India". It was inaugurated by the former President of India Pranab Mukherjee in the presence of the former Prime Minister of India Dr.Manmohan Singh and the incumbent Chief Minister of West Bengal Mamata Banerjee.

101st edition
The 101st edition of Indian Science Congress was held in Jammu starting from 3 February 2014 to 8 February.

102nd edition

The 102nd edition of Indian Science Congress was held in Mumbai from 3 January 2015 to 7 January 2015. It was inaugurated by Prime Minister Narendra Modi in Mumbai University. Studies and papers on Ancient Indian Vedas were presented in this Congress. Accomplishments of Ancient Indian Science in the fields of medicine, mathematics, surgery etc. were presented. There was also a session on India's successful Mars Orbiter Mission.

106th edition

The 106th edition of Indian Science Congress was held in Punjab from 3–7 January 2019. It was inaugurated by Narendra Modi and hosted around 30,000 scientists, including six Nobel laureates. It became known for controversial talks purporting, among other claims, that Newton's and Einstein's theories of gravity were wrong, and that gravitational waves should be renamed to "Narendra Modi waves"; that the demon-king Ravana had 24 types of aircraft and a network of airports in modern-day Sri Lanka; that ancient Indians knew of in vitro fertilization; that Brahma invented dinosaurs; and that Lord Vishnu had heat-seeking missiles.

Kamala Thiagarajan alleged that under the Bharatiya Janata Party, several scientists took part to push the views and ideals of Rashtriya Swayamsevak Sangh, a right-wing Hindu nationalist organization, into the mainstream. After the 106th Congress and several similar incidents over the previous few years, the Indian Science Congress established a policy that requires speakers at future conferences to be vetted and scrutinizes the content of their talks.

Sections, committees and forums of ISCA 
From a modest beginning of only hundred and five members, ISCA has grown into a strong fraternity with more than ten thousand members as of 2012. Only thirty-five papers were presented at the first Congress, a number that has risen to nearly one thousand.

In 2000, there were sixteen sections: Agricultural Science; Anthropology & Archaeology; Biochemistry, Biophysics & Molecular Biology; Botany; Chemistry; Computer science; Earth system science; Engineering science; Material science; Mathematics; Medical & Veterinary sciences; Physics; Physiology; Psychology & Educational Science; Statistics; and Zoology, Entomology & Fisheries. There were also two committees: Home science and Science & Society. Finally, there were also six forums: Communication & Information sciences; Environmental science; Forensic science; Science education; Science for school students; and Women & science.

There are now fourteen sections, including Agriculture and Forestry sciences; Animal, Veterinary and Fishery sciences; Anthropological and Behavioral sciences (including Archaeology and Psychology & Educational sciences); Chemical science; Earth system science; Engineering science; Environmental science; Information and Communication science & technology (including Computer science); Material science; Mathematical science (including Statistics); Medical science (including Physiology); New Biology (including Biochemistry, Biophysics & Molecular Biology; and Biotechnology); Physical science; and Plant science.

Interaction with foreign scientific academies/associations 
After independence ISCA has been actively represented in various foreign scientific academies/associations, namely British Association for the Advancement of Science, American Association for the Advancement of Science, French Academy of Sciences, Bangladesh Academy of Sciences, Sri Lanka Association for the Advancement of Science, etc. with a view to have a first hand knowledge on topics of mutual interest.

Conflict within the Indian science system
Corruption in India is a major problem and the science sector is no exception. ISCA has served as a platform to discuss the issues facing Indian scientists, with some calling for transparency, a meritocratic system, and an overhaul of the bureaucratic agencies that oversee science and technology. In her commentary on the centenary session of ISCA, Sumit Bhaduri stated, "[t]he challenges of turning Indian science into part of an innovation process are many. … Many competent Indian scientists aspire to be ineffectual administrators [due to administrative power and political patronage], rather than do the kind of science that makes a difference". Prime minister Manmohan Singh spoke at the 99th Indian Science Congress and commented on the state of the sciences in India, after an advisory council informed him there were problems with "the overall environment for innovation and creative work" and a 'warlike' approach was needed.

Sessions of Indian Science Congress

See also
Kerala Science Congress

References

 Hindustan Times dated 4 and 5 January 2011

External links
Official website of the Indian Science Congress Association
 Bihar Science Congress
 ISC102th Official Site
 ISC104th Official Site 

Scientific societies based in India
Organisations based in Kolkata
Scientific organizations established in 1914
1914 establishments in India